You Don't Know Jack is a series of video games developed by Jackbox Games (formerly known as Jellyvision Games) and Berkeley Systems, as well as the title of the first You Don't Know Jack game in the series. You Don't Know Jack, framed as a game show "where high culture and pop culture collide", combines trivia with comedy.

While it is primarily a PC and Mac-based franchise with over two dozen releases and compilations for those platforms, there have been a few entries released for consoles: two for the original PlayStation, and the 2011 release which had versions for the Xbox 360, PlayStation 3, Nintendo DS and Wii. In 2012, Jackbox Games developed and published a social version of the game on Facebook with cross-platform versions subsequently released for iOS, Android and Kindle. On November 5, 2013, the majority of the franchise's many volumes and spinoffs were reissued onto Steam by Jackbox Games.

On November 18, 2014, You Don’t Know Jack 2015  was released as part of The Jackbox Party Pack on Windows, macOS, Xbox 360, Xbox One, PlayStation 3, PlayStation 4, and later Nintendo Switch, iPad, Amazon Fire TV, Android TV, Nvidia Shield, Apple TV, and Xfinity X1. On October 17, 2018, You Don't Know Jack: Full Stream was released as part of The Jackbox Party Pack 5 for the same platforms as You Don't Know Jack 2015, with the exception of PlayStation 3 and Xbox 360.

History 
In 1991, Jellyvision's former identity, Learn Television, released the award-winning film The Mind's Treasure Chest, which featured lead character Jack Patterson. When Learn Television sought to use new multimedia technologies to create a more active learning experience, the company teamed up with Follett Software Company and developed "That's a Fact, Jack!", a reading motivation CD-ROM game show series covering young adult fiction, targeted to 3rd through 10th graders. The game would give a title for a child to read, and then ask questions related to that title.

The idea for You Don't Know Jack began while That's a Fact, Jack! was still in development. The game's title comes from the more vulgar version of the phrase: "You don't know jack shit".

Gameplay 
Most versions of the game can be played by up to three players. The game can be played by only one player on the website and the iOS app. The game can be played by up to four players on the tabletop version, You Don't Know Jack 2011 (except for the PC, WebTV, and Nintendo DS versions, which are limited to two players), the OUYA version, Party and the game in The Jackbox Party Pack titled You Don't Know Jack 2015. The Full Stream edition in The Jackbox Party Pack 5 can accommodate up to eight players plus up to 10,000 additional "Audience" members. All versions of the game feature the voice of an off-screen host, who reads questions aloud, provides instructions regarding special question types, and pokes fun at the players.

The game usually opens with a green room segment, in which the players are prompted to enter their names and given instructions for play. The audio during this segment includes rehearsing singers, a busy producer, and a harassed studio manager/host. The only graphics are a large "On Air/Stand By" sign in the middle of the screen, visual representations of the players' button assignments, and a box for name entry. If the players take too long to think of their names or if the players press the "return" or "enter" key without typing in their names, then the announcer will name the players.

In games starting with the Netshow, on certain days, such as Christmas Eve, or certain times such as a Saturday night, or even during Twilight, the announcer will mention the time of day or the special holiday, and sometimes grumble about the game being played at that time or on that day. There is no box for name entry in the second episode of The Ride. In the PlayStation versions, after the game is finished, players can name themselves next to the score recorded. In the console versions of You Don't Know Jack 2011, the OUYA version, and the single-player games of You Don't Know Jack 2015, the players are prompted to choose their names that they typed in before starting the game. (The console versions of You Don't Know Jack 2011 also allows players to make new names in the "Contestants" section.)

If one or more players choose the "I don't care" option, the announcer or the host will tell that they refused to enter their names. Additionally in these games, the sign-in screen is famous for an Easter egg where if the player types in the phrase "fuck you" as their name. The phrase will be changed to a good name afterwards. In You Don't Know Jack 2011 and OUYA, the announcer will tell the player that they have no friends or didn't use proper English.

In You Don't Know Jack 2015, the host will punish the player for typing the offending name. If the player does it once, the host will deduct $1,000 from their score. If the player does it again, the host will deduct $50,001 from their score. (The deduction is only cinematic, and does not persist to the first question of the game.) If the player does it three or more times, the host will end the game with a goat, forcing the player to return to the main menu of the game.

Most versions of You Don't Know Jack offer the choice of playing a 7- or 21-question game; some versions offer only 15 questions (the Netshow, Louder! Faster! Funnier!, 5th Dementia and Mock 2), and others offer only 13 questions (The Ride), 11 questions (HeadRush, You Don't Know Jack 2011, iOS, OUYA, Party, You Don't Know Jack 2015 and Full Stream), or 7 questions ("The Lost Gold" and the Flash website). In a 21-question game, there is a brief intermission after the tenth question. Most questions are multiple choice, with some occasional free-entry questions, or mini-games. The Facebook version offers only 5 questions.

In its original format (Vol. 1, Sports, Vol. 2, Movies, TV, Vol 3, HeadRush, Offline, Louder! Faster! Funnier! and "The Lost Gold"), before each question, one player is given a choice of three categories. Each has a humorous title that has some connection to the topic of the corresponding question. After a short animated introduction, which is often followed by a sung jingle about the question number, the host asks the question. Typically, the question is multiple choice and players are given 10 seconds to select an answer. The first player to "buzz in" and give the correct answer wins the money for that question and gets to choose the next category.

If a player answers incorrectly, they lose money, but not before the host wisecracks about it. If all players answer incorrectly, or if none of the players buzz in and answer the question before the timer runs out, the host will reveal the correct answer; failing to answer doesn't affect a player's score, the host will then randomly choose a player to select another category. In The Ride, 5th Dementia, Mock 2, the website, You Don't Know Jack 2011, iOS, the Facebook version, OUYA, Party, You Don't Know Jack 2015 and Full Stream, the category is chosen by the host or pre-assigned to an episode.

Players can still buzz and answer within 10 seconds in The Ride, 5th Dementia and Mock 2, while in You Don't Know Jack 2011, the Facebook version, OUYA, Party, You Don't Know Jack 2015 and Full Stream, all players answer separately within 20 seconds (more than one player can select the same answer). There are occasionally other question types offered (see below).

In earlier versions' multi-player games, each player is allowed one chance to "screw" an opponent in each half of a full (21-question) game, or once in an entire short (7-question) game. Using the "screw" forces the opponent to give an answer to a question within 10 seconds. If the player who is "screwed" answers correctly, they win the money while the player who "screwed" them loses money. This basic design has changed slightly in some versions of the game.

For example, in the teen spinoff HeadRush, the screws are replaced by pairs of false teeth, so players "bite" their opponent instead. In The Ride, the feature is known as "FlakJack" and allows a player to fire multiple screws into the screen, partially or totally obscuring the question and answers. The player then chooses an opponent, who must answer even if the question is no longer readable. In German-language versions of the series, nails are used instead of screws.

In You Don't Know Jack 2011, OUYA, Party and You Don't Know Jack 2015, if a player uses the screw on an opponent, they only have 5 seconds to answer the question. If the screwed player answers incorrectly or fails to answer before the 5 seconds are up, the player who used the screw takes the money from them. It is possible to use the screw on yourself, but after the host tells you about the screw, you will still lose the money based on the time you used it at.

In Full Stream, either one or two screws (depending on the total number of players in the game, not counting Audience members) could be awarded in one of two ways: (1) they could be given to the player(s) who gave the fewest correct answers in Question 3, the "DisOrDat" round; and (2) to the lowest-scoring player(s) at the break before Question 6, which starts Round Two. (Several factors—too numerous to name here—determined how many screws would be awarded in each case, and players could only hold one screw at a time.) Unlike previous versions of the game, screws can affect all other players instead of just one (most notably if they have not yet answered before the screw is activated), and they make the question more difficult to answer for the players instead of forcing them to answer within a short amount of time.

Those include removing all vowels from the answers on their devices, flipping the text of the question and the answers upside-down or backwards on their devices, making the text of the question and the answers on their devices extremely small or large, making the answers hashtagged on their devices, putting the answers on their devices into shades of gray, or bouncing the answers around the screen in the style of a DVD screensaver program. Others include forcing the players to enter a password, scroll through an excessively long "Terms of Service" form, or change their screen names before being able to select an answer. After the correct answer is revealed, the player who used the screw earns extra money.

In earlier games, different category options were worth differing amounts of money, which was revealed after a category was chosen. This amount indicated how difficult the question would be. Amounts initially varied between $1,000, $2,000, & $3,000, and were doubled during the second round of questions. However, Vol. 1, Sports, Vol. 2 and Movies occasionally featured questions hosted by guests spawned from Fiber Optic Field Trips and Celebrity Collect Calls; these were worth $5,000 and appeared as the first question of the second round.

Later games in the series didn't give players three randomly generated categories, but instead gave a set number of questions in a set order. In The Ride, players 'buzz in' to set the amount of money the question is worth. Values could range from only a few hundred dollars to $10,000 or more. In 5th Dementia, the amounts of money each player sets add up to the total amount. In Mock 2, the host chooses a category and sets the amount of money to either  $1,000, $2,000, or $3,000.

In the website, You Don't Know Jack 2011, iOS, the Facebook version, OUYA, Party and You Don't Know Jack 2015, players win money based on how long it took to answer correctly within the 20 seconds. The money is not doubled on the website or the Facebook version, but it was doubled in You Don't Know Jack 2011, iOS, OUYA, Party and You Don't Know Jack 2015. In Full Stream, all questions in categories the host selected are worth $1,000 (double in Round 2).

Some of the volumes have a feature called "Don't Be a Wimp", which is activated if one player has a very large lead. If no one answers a question, the host may deride the leading player, calling on the audience to shout "Don't be a wimp!", and forcing the leader to answer the question.

In some volumes, the host also punishes a player who buzzes in too early; the question disappears and a text box shows up, leaving the player with 10 seconds to type the answer. For The Ride and 5th Dementia, this is replaced by different punishments: the player is forced to pick from a list of four nonsensical answers, all of which are wrong, or both the question and answers are scrambled. This punishment is only triggered if a player buzzes in at the very instant that the question appears on the screen. In those three instances, the player that buzzed in too early is not permitted to "screw" the other players.

In some volumes, the host removes the question so the players don't cheat; the four possible choices are still shown.

Question types 
The majority of You Don't Know Jack questions are multiple choice, with four possible choices. Some questions are fill-in-the-blank, requiring a typed response.

Special questions are also played during the game. Each version of You Don't Know Jack has its own different types of special questions, but some of the most common are:

DisOrDat: This exists in all versions except Vol. 1 and Sports. Only one player plays the DisOrDat with a 30-second time limit (in earlier games, this is played by the player that got the question right, in later games, this is played by the player with the lowest score). The player is given two categories and seven different subjects, and it is up to the player to determine which category the subject falls under (or, in some cases, whether the subject fits both of the two categories). For example, the player might have to determine if Jay Leno was a daytime or a nighttime talk show host, if orecchiette is a type of pasta or a parasite, or if "Urban" is the name of a Pope or a Britney Spears song. Money is added for every correct answer, and deducted (or stolen by the other player(s) in the offline version of You Don't Know Jack 2011, Roku, OUYA, Party and You Don't Know Jack 2015) for every wrong answer, as usual; any questions not answered before the 30 seconds expires are treated as wrong, and penalized accordingly. In Full Stream, all players play the DisOrDat simultaneously with a 5- or 10-second time limit for each subject.
Gibberish Questions: These exist in all versions except HeadRush, the PlayStation versions, the website, You Don't Know Jack 2011, iOS, Roku, OUYA, Party and You Don't Know Jack 2015. Players are given a mondegreen: a nonsensical phrase whose syllables rhyme with a more common phrase or title. For example, "Pre-empt Tires, Like Crack" could be the gibberish to The Empire Strikes Back. The question has a time limit of 30 seconds, and the first player to buzz in and type the correct answer wins the money. Clues are given as time passes, but the money decreases by 5% of the initial starting value with every 1.5 seconds that elapse. The money could go unrewarded if the amount goes down to $0. In The Ride, the money decreases steadily over the entire 30 seconds. This question is famous for an Easter egg where if the first player types in the phrase "fuck you" ("fuck off" in the British version, and "Arschloch" in the German versions) as the answer, the host will respond annoyed and will either deduct $50,000 from their score or reset their score to $0 (whichever punishment is bigger), may deduct an additional $100,000 from their score, and may change their name. If another player does it, the host will respond by chastising that player for a lack of originality, but will not deduct any money from their score or change their name. If a third player does it, the host will declare the game to be over and leave, automatically closing out the software. If the player presses any key while the host is talking, the host will say an extra statement regarding that the game is ending regardless of what the player does before the software closes out. This Easter egg varies in later volumes of the game. In the 5th Dementia, the host will respond by deducting $100,000 from the first player that typed the offending answer and replacing the player's spaceship avatar with a bare foot. If another player does it, the host will deduct $2 from that player's score. If a third player does it, the host will declare the game to be over and leave, automatically closing out the software as usual. No additional dialogue from the host is provided from pressing any keys. Furthermore, no name change is given to any of the players. In "The Lost Gold", the host will respond by deducting $52,681 from the first player that typed the offending answer and changing the player's name to "Arschloch" (a hold-over from the German Vol. 4, where the easter egg is triggered by typing "Arschloch"). If another player does it, the host will deduct $92,681 from that player's score, but will not change their name. If a third player does it, the host will declare the game to be over and leave, but instead of forcing the software to close out, the host will take the players to a joke mini-game called "Gorilla Hunter"; the player is given six bullets, but there's nothing to shoot at and the gun cannot be reloaded, forcing the players to exit the game manually through the pause menu. In the Facebook version, the host mocks the player saying that he can say the "nasty words" as well and proceeds to say a lot of them bleeped-out of context; no extra money is lost other than the normal wrong answer penalty. In Full Stream, after the answer is revealed, the host will beam an Easter egg to the device of any players who entered in “fuck you” which explains the history of the Easter egg to them, with the host assuming they entered it in only for the Easter egg, and like in the Facebook version, no extra money is lost.
Anagram Questions: These only exist in 5th Dementia and "The Lost Gold", and follow the same rules as the Gibberish Questions; however, instead of trying to figure out a rhyme, players must rearrange the letters given into a saying, name, or other group (as in the famous example of "genuine class" being an anagram of "Alec Guinness"). Unlike in other question types requiring a typed-in answer, the answer to an Anagram Question must be spelled exactly right to win the money. This type of question also appears in the Facebook version, but instead of being text-based, it is multiple choice.
HeadButt: Only existing in HeadRush, these also follow the rules of the Gibberish Questions. Players are given a word equation (for example, "color of pickles + opposite of night") and have to put it together to form a name or other group (in this case, the color of pickles is "Green", and the opposite of night is "Day", so the answer would be "Green Day").
Fiber Optic Field Trips: These only exist in Vol. 1, Sports, Vol. 2, and Movies, and only appear in full (21-question) games. The host calls a random person from out of the phonebook and asks them to come up with a trivia question. Fiber Optic Field Trips are initiated during the first half of the game, and the trivia question hosted by the special guest is the first question of the second half. All categories for this question type are worth $5,000. 
Celebrity Collect Calls: These only exist in Vol. 2 and follow the same basic format as the Fiber Optic Field Trips. The host calls a celebrity and asks them to come up with a trivia question. Celebrities include Tim Allen, Florence Henderson, and Vanessa L. Williams. Sometimes, the conversation between the host and the celebrity lasts a very long time.
Pub Quizzes: These replace the Fiber Optic Field Trips and Celebrity Collect Calls in the British version of the game. Instead of calling a random person in a city, the host calls a bartender in a random pub within the UK to give the players a question.
Trash Talkin' with Milan: Only existing in HeadRush, "Milan the Janitor" (voiced by Igor Gasowski) hosts a standard multiple choice question about grammar.
Bug Out: This only exists in 5th Dementia. The goal is simple: Bugs will crawl and display a choice. When you see a choice that does not match the clue, buzz in. In a multiplayer match, if you are right, your opponents pay you money, but if you are wrong, you pay your opponents.
Fill in the Blank: Instead of having four answers to choose from, you have to type the answer out.
Sequel Question: Some questions have questions that refer to them and are guaranteed to appear immediately after them. When this happens, all three selectable categories will refer to the Sequel Question. In The Ride, 5th Dementia, Mock 2, the website, You Don't Know Jack 2011, iOS, OUYA, Party and You Don't Know Jack 2015, all questions are arranged into 'episodes' whose questions always appear in the same order. This allows for a question to refer to any previous question, and for running jokes to be made. In You Don't Know Jack 2011, as the question sets are set into episodes, there will be questions that are 20 or 30 questions after the first. ('A Harp out of Harp' related to Cookie's party episode.) In Full Stream, there are also Sequel Questions, most notably in a series of questions with a "Special Guest" (see Guest Host Question below). Additionally, in Full Stream, certain series of questions can also trigger a specific post-game event, like with the question “This Question Is Computer Generated”, which is followed by Nate Shapiro hosting an episode of Truth Talk 23/7 after the game.
Pissed About A Question: A special kind of Sequel Question. This only exists in both Offline volumes. Jellyvision creates new questions about angry letters they have received from irritated players. Each of these questions is based upon a letter from a viewer who complained about the previous question.
RoadKill/Coinkydink: This only exists in The Ride (as RoadKill) and Mock 2 (as Coinkydink). In this fast-paced question type, players are given two clues (for example, "Sexy voice" and "Hefty kid"). Several words fly past in rapid succession, and the players must buzz in when the word on the screen connects the two clues in a pair (in this case, the answer is "husky"). At the end of the question, players can earn a bonus for choosing the category which all the correct answers have in common.
Jack BINGO: This only exists in The Ride. A five-letter word related to the episode's theme is first given (for example, W-I-M-P-S in an episode about gym class). A clue to an answer is provided, after which the letters in the given word are randomly lit. The players must buzz in when the first letter to the clue's answer is lit. (In the example, the clue may be "SNL's Doug and Wendy __"; the player rings in when the "W" is lit for the word "Whiner.") $500 and that answer's letter is given to the first player who is correct, and the next clue is given; a $500 penalty is received for wrongly timed responses. The first to collect enough answers to spell out the given word wins the prize declared before the start of this mini-round; it can go unrewarded if nobody finishes the word after a set number of clues.
ThreeWay: This only exists in Vol. 3 and the first PlayStation version. Players are given three words that have something in common (for example, solid, liquid, and gas) and several clues that only relate to one of the words (for example, "__ Plumr"). Players must match the clues to the proper words. The possible answers flash up on the screen, and the players must buzz in when the correct answer appears (in this case, "liquid").
Wendithap'n: This exists in Louder! Faster! Funnier!, Mock 2 and "The Lost Gold" and its German version You Don't Know Jack Vol. 4 (as Wann War Was?) and follows the same rules as the ThreeWay. The player is given an event (either in pop culture history, or in sequence order) and must decide if several other events occurred before it, after it, or never occurred at all.
Guest Host Question: Someone else hosts the question, and it appears in Vol. 3 and The Ride. In Full Stream, this question is known as a "Special Guest" Question with Jimmy Fallon (which bleeds over into the rest of that particular game).
Impossible Questions: Only existing in Vol. 3 and the first PlayStation version, Impossible Questions are worth very large amounts of money, but as the name implies, they are almost always very, very difficult. Examples of Impossible Questions include what color eyes the bald guy has on the box of You Don't Know Jack Sports, the number of years between the invention of the can and that of the first practical can opener within a two-year range (high or low), what number between one and nine the host is thinking of, or what the third word is in the third scene in the third act of Richard III. They can be either multiple choice or fill-in-the-blank. In a case of double-bluffing, one question, 'What has four legs, a tail, and barks?', has the category 'It's a Dog!' and the answer 'a dog'. "The Lost Gold" has a variation of this question as well, not formally named and consisting of Pirate-themed questions such as "What was the name of Blackbeard's Parrot?" This was connected to the game's plot - as explained in the game's introduction, a pirate has been cursed to haunt the game until its players accrue enough 'booty'. The pirate has thus secretly arranged the pirate-themed questions, which he believes are still common knowledge, in an attempt to speed up the process, not realizing how obscure and archaic his knowledge has become.
Super Audio Question: A sound will play, and the host will ask you a question about it.
Whatshisname Question: In this question, the host is trying to remember a certain name of a person, place, or other group. A clue is provided every few seconds, and the player must buzz in and type the name to win the money. This question is known in HeadRush as Old Man's Moldy Memories and in You Don't Know Jack 2015 as Foggy Facts with Old Man which both feature the character of "Old Man" (voiced by Andy Poland) in which he hosts the question.
Picture Question: This is similar to the Super Audio Question, but based on a picture rather than a sound.
Who's The Dummy?: This exists in You Don't Know Jack 2011, iOS, the Facebook version, OUYA, Party and You Don't Know Jack 2015. The host has taken up ventriloquism, and asks a trivia question by way of his ventriloquist dummy, Billy O'Brien (or his sister Betty O'Brien). As the host explains, he has difficulty pronouncing consonant sounds such as B's, P's, and M's (which become D's, T's, and N's, respectively, and are translated as such in the text of the question and the answer choices), which adds a minor layer of difficulty to the question. The dummy also hosts one question in Full Stream.
Cookie's Fortune Cookie Fortunes (with Cookie "Fortune Cookie" Masterson): This exists in You Don't Know Jack 2011, iOS, the Facebook version, OUYA, Party and You Don't Know Jack 2015. This mini-round appears randomly and includes trivia questions inspired by cliche fortune cookie messages that Cookie Masterson receives. For example, the fortune "You have a magnetic personality." leads to a question regarding which metal-based fictional character might be most attracted to him.
Funky Trash: This exists in You Don't Know Jack 2011, iOS, the Facebook version, OUYA, Party and You Don't Know Jack 2015. The host roots through the trash of a famous person, and the players must identify that person by his or her trash. For example, a World War I ambulance driver's license, cigar butts from Cuba, and a can of ointment for 6-toed cats would be clues to Ernest Hemingway.
It's The Put The Choices Into Order Then Buzz In And See If You Are Right... Question: This exists in You Don't Know Jack 2011, iOS, the Facebook version, OUYA, Party and You Don't Know Jack 2015. The host gives three or four items and the player has to buzz in to the corresponding correct answer. The question is multiple choice, meaning that, technically, the player does not have to put the answers into the right order themselves but rather just pick the right order out of the four possibilities. For example, the player might have to determine the order in which the St. Louis Arch, the McDonald's Golden Arches, and the Archie comic book series debuted. Answering correctly awards the player an extra $1,000, however, the extra money is not lost if a player is wrong.
Nocturnal Admissions (with Cookie Masterson): Only existing in You Don't Know Jack 2011, Cookie Masterson tells the player about a dream he had, which is based on a movie. The player then has to tell which movie that dream was about. The characters of the movie are replaced by Cookie himself, his cats and his mother, which often makes it difficult to figure out the correct one. For example, Cookie tells of a dream in which he transferred his mind into a fake cat body so he could learn the culture of his two cats. He does this to help with his mother's research, but falls into love with the cat world and is therefore attacked by his mother's troops. The correct answer to this dream would be James Cameron's Avatar.
Wrong Answer of the Game: Not a question in and of itself, the Wrong Answer of the Game appears in You Don't Know Jack 2011, OUYA, Party and You Don't Know Jack 2015. Before the beginning of the game, Schmitty announces a satirical sponsor for the episode (similar to The Ride). If a player manages to buzz in with the wrong answer associated with the sponsor, they win $4,000 (double in Round 2) and a 'prize' from the sponsor, instead of losing money. For example, in the episode sponsored by 'BloodCo.', answering with the incorrect answer 'Dracula' awards money and a bucket of human blood.
Elephant, Mustard, Teddy Roosevelt or Dracula? / Kangaroo, Peanut, Albert Einstein or Uranus? / Octopus, Coffee, Queen Elizabeth or Frankenstein?: First appeared in the iOS and Facebook versions, questions in this category always have the same four answer choices: Elephant, Mustard, Teddy Roosevelt and Dracula. The question is posed in definition form, such as "Could be considered a Bull Moose". The player must decide, of the four answer choices, which one fits the definition. In this case, the answer is Teddy Roosevelt; he ran for president in 1912 as the Progressive Party's candidate, and his party was nicknamed the Bull Moose Party. The concept is the same in You Don't Know Jack 2015 with Kangaroo, Peanut, Albert Einstein, and Uranus, and in Full Stream with Octopus, Coffee, Queen Elizabeth, and Frankenstein, which could be either the monster or the Doctor (and is specified in the question's animation).
Data Mining: This only exists in Full Stream. A selection of a well-known personality's search history, in the form of queries or statements, are read to the players, who then have to choose the correct person the searches came from. For example, the searches "Directions to get around that track", "Is 'I ain't no' grammatically correct?", and "Why do these bananas taste like [REDACTED]?" would belong to Gwen Stefani (referencing lyrics from her song Hollaback Girl). Data Mining is a spiritual successor to Funky Trash.
Player's Choice: This only exists in Full Stream. At a moment of the game, the Binjpipe host asks players, including the audience, to vote between two question categories. The question with the highest percentage of the votes is the question that will be asked. (In case of a 50%/50% tie, the Binjpipe host chooses between the two, presumably at random.) Examples of choices include: "An easy question" or "A hard question", and "A question with airhorns" or "A question ABOUT airhorns".
Binjpipe Recommends: This only exists in Full Stream. A question is based on the genre, subject(s) or rating of a movie or TV show that is recommended by Binjpipe, presumably influenced by your prior "viewing choices" or internet research as referred to in the question.

Jack Attack 
The final round of the game, called the Jack Attack in most versions and also known as the HeadRush in HeadRush, is a word association question. The category for this final round—which generally describes the desired correct answers—was determined differently, depending on which version of the game is being played. In earlier versions of the game, this was based on the final selected category; in later versions, the category is selected by the game or pre-assigned to an episode.

In most versions of the game, a word, phrase, or name appears in the middle of the screen, to which the player must find an associated word or phrase that fits the overall category. For example, Star Wars might be the associated word, and the correct answer fitting "movie stars" could be Harrison Ford. Other possibilities offered might include actors not in that film, or other objects or concepts related to the film but which are not stars of the movie. For each associated subject, several potential matches appear on screen one-at-a-time for only a few seconds each before disappearing, and only one is correct. The topics and/or potential answers are sometimes humorous.

Players win money if they buzz in when the correct match is displayed on the screen. An incorrect guess deducts money from the player's score—not just once, but every time the player buzzes in incorrectly (it is possible to buzz in incorrectly multiple times while the same incorrect answer is shown). The money earned or lost was $2,000 in most You Don't Know Jack volumes, $5,000 in HeadRush, an amount set by the players in The Ride and 5th Dementia, $4,000 in You Don't Know Jack 2011, iOS and Roku, $1,000 in the Facebook version, and $100, $500, or $1,000 in Full Stream depending on how long it takes the player to press the answer. Multiple players play simultaneously, playing to the same words. The words that are not matched will be cycled back in once all seven subjects have been attempted.

Jack Attack ends after either all seven subjects are either (a) matched with the right answer, or (b) attempted twice (some subjects are attempted three times). The exceptions are in some episodes of You Don't Know Jack 2011 and iOS, and all episodes of the Facebook version and You Don't Know Jack 2015, where all seven subjects are only shown once.

In Full Stream, only six subjects are given per "Attack". In each case, the same clue and subject in the center of the screen are presented to the players, with six associated words—added two at a time—can all be available at once, and more than one answer can be correct. Players earn money for correct choices and lose money for incorrect choices. Then the players choose their answers, the less money is earned or lost per choice (either $1,000, $500, or $100). And since each player answers separately on their device, all players can score—either positively or negatively—on all the answers, but only once per selected answer.

In all versions of the game, the running total of each player's score is not shown anywhere on the screen during Jack Attack, and this part of the game is usually accompanied by ominous music or ambient sounds. This creates tension between players because of the uncertainty of ranking, and the unsettling atmosphere.

Game show theme 
Throughout the You Don't Know Jack franchise, there has been a running theme of You Don't Know Jack taking place on a self-titled televised game show where the players are the contestants. This idea is shown by satirical fake commercials that can be heard while starting the game, and in most games, after the game has finished (see below).

In Full Stream, instead of the game taking place on a traditional broadcast TV game show, the game becomes a show hosted on a fictional streaming service called Binjpipe. Between questions, the game navigates through the Binjpipe interface. During the game, a new female host (representing Binjpipe) speaks before the game, and hosts some question types like Binjpipe Recommends and Data Mining.

Commercials 
One of the unique features of the game takes place after it has ended. Before you start a new game, you can choose to listen to You Don't Know Jack staff performing parodies of various radio commercials. The commercials vary in absurdity, selling products such as scented suppositories or foreign language cassettes to help you learn how to speak American.

They also featured phony news stories about everyday things. Examples: "Oxygen: Gas of Life? or Secret Military Death-Vapor?"  or "People are falling unconscious for 8 hours every night.  What is the 'sleeping disease'? Do you have it? Find out tonight."

Most You Don't Know Jack games feature recurring characters like "Chocky the Chipmunk", a breakfast cereal mascot with the catchphrase "Pink and tartie!" or "Xenora: Queen of Battle", a parody of Xena, Warrior Princess that gets involved in overtly erotic situations. Others are "The Movie Ending Phone", "1-800-me4-sale", "Cancer Stick tobacco lip balm", "Momma's Pride Human Breast Milk", "Buster's Bait Shop" and parodies of public service announcements from the fictional "United States Department of Condescending Paternalism".

The first CD-ROM for The Ride features a CD of a selection of these commercials from the previous games in the series. The disc was titled You Don't Hear Jack and has since been released as a separate product on CD. A second disc titled You Don't Hear Jack 2 was also released featuring commercials from newer versions of You Don't Know Jack. Both are available for digital download.

In Full Stream, commercials for Binjpipe are heard during the sign-in screen while players join in the game. In the post-game, radio shows are heard instead of commercials.

Hosts 
There have been many different hosts of You Don't Know Jack over the years. The following is a list of hosts and the games they appear in.

 Nate Shapiro (voiced by Harry Gottlieb) – Nate Shapiro was the first host of the series. He hosts Vol. 1, the Netshow, the tabletop game, and episodes 49 to 58 of The Ride. He also hosts a post-game radio show known as Truth Talk 23/7 in Full Stream. He is not to be confused with "Nate the Intern" from the Flash incarnation (voiced by Production & SQA Coordinator Nathan Fernald).
 Guy Towers (voiced by Andy Poland) – He hosts Sports, Sports: The Netshow, and episodes 17 to 32 of The Ride.
 Buzz Lippman (voiced by Peter B. Spector) – He hosts Vol. 2 and appears in some episodes of The Ride. He is Nate Shapiro's cousin.
 Cookie Masterson (voiced by Tom Gottlieb) – Cookie Masterson is the most well-known host of the franchise. He originally served as the sign-in host, taking down players' names in the opening green room segments of Vol. 1, Sports and Vol. 2. He hosts the Netshow, Movies, Vol. 3, the first PlayStation version, episodes 1 to 16 of The Ride, Offline, You Don't Know Jack 2011, iOS, the Facebook version, OUYA, Party, You Don't Know Jack 2015 and Full Stream. He also hosted the daily webshows that appeared on the You Don't Know Jack website from December 2006 through September 2008 (with one special episode in November 2010). He was also the announcer for the short-lived You Don't Know Jack TV show in 2001.
 Josh "Schmitty" Schmitstinstein (voiced by Phil Ridarelli) – Josh Schmitstinstein, or "Schmitty", well known as the host of Lie Swatter and the Quiplash series, is the most recent of all the American CD-ROM hosts. He hosts the Netshow, TV, episodes 33 to 48 of The Ride, Louder! Faster! Funnier! (the second Offline game), 5th Dementia (the Online game), Mock 2 (the second PlayStation game), and "The Lost Gold". He also hosted one particular question in Cookie's volume of Offline. He also announced the sponsors in You Don't Know Jack 2011, the Facebook version, OUYA, Party and You Don't Know Jack 2015. In Full Stream, he hosts a post-game radio show called You Don't Know Jack: Oldies Radio.
 Bob (voiced by Andy Poland) – The host of HeadRush.
 Jack Cake (voiced by Paul Kaye) – The host of the only British version of You Don't Know Jack.
 Quizmaster Jack (voiced by Axel Malzacher in Vol. 1 and Kai Taschner in Vol. 2, Vol. 3: 'Abwärts!, & Vol. 4) – The host of the German versions of You Don't Know Jack.
 Masatoshi Hamada – The host of the only Japanese version of You Don't Know Jack, and the only host who is not a fictional character.
 Troy Stevens (played by Paul Reubens) – The host of the 2001 You Don't Know Jack TV show. He is the only host whose full physical appearance is known.

Game list 
This is a list of the You Don't Know Jack games released:

 You Don't Know Jack (Vol. 1) – September 12, 1995
 You Don't Know Jack Question Pack – 1996 (You Don't Know Jack Vol. 1 must already be installed to play)
 You Don't Know Jack Sports – September 30, 1996
 You Don't Know Jack Vol. 2 – November 30, 1996
 You Don't Know Jack the Netshow – 1996–2000
 You Don't Know Jack Movies – April 30, 1997
 You Don't Know Jack TV – May 9, 1997
 You Don't Know Jack Sports: The Netshow – 1997
 You Don't Know Jack Vol. 3 – October 31, 1997
 HeadRush (a teen spin-off game) – April 20, 1998
 You Don't Know Jack (tabletop edition) by Tiger Electronics - 1998
 NOTE: Game came with 500 General Knowledge questions on 125 cards; additional 113-card, 450-question Expansion Packs with TV, Movies and Sports themed trivia were also released.
 You Don't Know Jack Vol. 4: The Ride – November 30, 1998
 You Don't Know Jack Offline (the best of the Netshow on Disk) – 1999
 You Don't Know Jack (PlayStation, has similarities to Vol. 3) – 1999
 You Don't Know Jack Louder! Faster! Funnier! (2nd Offline game) – March 28, 2000
 You Don't Know Jack 5th Dementia (Online game) – November 1, 2000
 You Don't Know Jack Mock 2 (2nd PlayStation game) – November 1, 2000
 You Don't Know Jack Vol. 6: "The Lost Gold" – December 1, 2003
 You Don't Know Jack (Online beta game on the You Don't Know Jack website) – 2006–2008
 You Don't Know Jack – February 8, 2011
 You Don't Know Jack (iOS) – April 2011
 You Don't Know Jack (Facebook) – May 26, 2012 (shut down March 1, 2015)
 You Don't Know Jack (second mobile game) (shut down March 1, 2015)
 iOS - December 13, 2012
 You Dont Know Jack Lite – 2012
 You Dont Know Jack (Roku) – 2012
 Android - May 21, 2013
 You Don't Know Jack (OUYA) - June 11, 2013
 You Don't Know Jack Party (has similarities to OUYA) - September 19, 2013
 You Don't Know Jack 2015 (Part of The Jackbox Party Pack) - November 18, 2014
 NOTE: Game contains 15 episodes from OUYA and Party.
 You Don't Know Jack: Full Stream (Part of The Jackbox Party Pack 5) - October 17, 2018

There is also a British version, a French version, a Japanese version, and the following German versions:

 You Don't Know Jack Vol. 1 – based on U.S. Vol. 2
 You Don't Know Jack Vol. 2 – based on U.S. Vol. 3
 You Don't Know Jack Vol. 3: 'Abwärts!''' – based on U.S. Vol. 4 ("The Ride")
 You Don't Know Jack Vol. 4 – later used as a base for U.S. Vol. 6 ("The Lost Gold")

 Reception 
The You Don't Know Jack series shipped 500,000 units by December 1996. Shipments in the United States alone rose to nearly 1 million by February 1998. By 2001, the You Don't Know Jack series had totaled sales of 3.5 million copies. YDKJ sold above 4.5 million copies and drew revenues above $100 million by 2008.

Inside Mac Games named You Don't Know Jack 2 the best puzzle game of 1996. The editors wrote that it "continues the high standards established by Berkeley's breakaway classic". It received a score of 4 out of 5 from MacUser.You Don't Know Jack Movies was a runner-up for Computer Gaming Worlds 1997 "Puzzle Game of the Year" award, which ultimately went to Smart Games Challenge 2. The editors called Movies a "hilarious party game", and noted that it "came a close second".You Don't Know Jack XL won two 1996 Spotlight Awards, for "Best Script, Story or Interactive Writing" and "Best Trivia or Puzzle Game".You Don't Know Jack Vol. 3 was the finalist for GameSpot's 1997 "Best Puzzles and Classics Game" award, which ultimately went to Chessmaster 5500. The editors wrote, "[I]f it weren't for the addition of the Threeway question format (which is a complete dud), You Don't Know Jack III would have reached instant-classic status."You Don't Know Jack Vol. 4: The Ride won Computer Gaming Worlds award for the best classic game of 1998. The editors wrote, "You Don't Know Jack Vol. 4: The Ride ranks easily as the best since the first of the series found its way into the CGW Hall of Fame. And for that we salute the folks at Berkeley Systems and Jellyvision, game designers who really do know Jack, at least where our funny bones are concerned." It also won the 1998 Spotlight Award for "Best Trivia, Puzzle or Classic Game" from the Game Developers Conference.You Don't Know Jack: Huge received a score of 4.5 out of 5 from Michael Gowan of Macworld, who wrote that the game "will strain your brain while amusing you with its witty banter and rapid-fire action." In 1998, The Huge collection was named the 48th-best computer game of all time by PC Gamer US, whose editors called it "essential stuff."

 Other media 
During the 2000 presidential election, Sierra On-Line president David Grenewetzki challenged the presidential candidates to play a political version of You Don't Know Jack. The game had been distributed to a few radio stations, and was described as a "litmus test" of the candidates' political knowledge.You Don't Know Jack also appeared as two books: You Don't Know Jack: The Book and You Don't Know Jack: The TV Book.  Both were published in 1998 by Running Press.

There was also a Tiger Electronic tabletop game of You Don't Know Jack, emceed by Nate Shapiro. It featured question cards with a number code on them and a grey button to open a sliding door to show the answers. It was the first game to feature 4 players instead of 3 players. There were also "Sports", "Movies", and "TV" question packs that were sold separately. A standalone handheld version was also released.

An actual television show version of You Don't Know Jack had a brief run on ABC in prime time during the summer of 2001. It starred Paul Reubens (the actor and comedian best known for his character Pee-wee Herman) as over-the-top game show host Troy Stevens, with Tom Gottlieb's 'Cookie' as the announcer.  The show lasted only six episodes, as it received very little buzz and most You Don't Know Jack fans weren't even aware of its existence until long after its cancellation. A previous attempt had been made by Telepictures Productions and Warner Bros. Television in 1996, produced by Ron Greenberg in Chicago; this version, intended as a weekday syndicated show, was not picked up (after initial tests and run-throughs necessitated a retooling of the show; Telepictures subsequently chose to drop the project).

After the You Don't Know Jack TV show ended, another show from the makers of You Don't Know Jack called Smush aired on USA Network in late 2001. It was a game of taking two or more words and combining them into one long word.  The show started late at night, but was later pushed to later and later times, even up to 3:00 A.M.; until it was eventually canceled.

In 2001, AMC released You Don't Know Jack about MonsterFest'', an online game on their website emceed by Schmitty, and the MonsterFest movie marathon was hosted by Clive Barker and Carmen Electra, who gave clues for the game.

References

External links 
 Official You Don't Know Jack website (now redirects to the Jackbox Party Pack 1 store page)
 

 
Video game franchises
Quiz video games
Windows games
Classic Mac OS games
PlayStation (console) games
Xbox 360 games
PlayStation 3 games
Wii games
Nintendo DS games
Tiger Electronics handheld games
Cancelled Game Boy games
Cancelled Game.com games
Webby Award winners
Webfoot Technologies games
Video games adapted into television shows
Video games developed in the United States
Video game franchises introduced in 1995